Arlington Township is a township in Sibley County, Minnesota, United States. The population was 562 at the 2000 census.

History
Arlington Township was organized in 1858.

Geography

Demographics
As of the census of 2000, there were 562 people, 194 households, and 166 families residing in the township.  The population density was 16.2 people per square mile (6.3/km2). There were 199 housing units at an average density of 5.7/sq mi (2.2/km2). The racial makeup of the township was 100.00% White.

There were 194 households, out of which 39.2% had children under the age of 18 living with them, 78.4% were married couples living together, 3.1% had a female householder with no husband present, and 14.4% were non-families. 12.9% of all households were made up of individuals, and 6.7% had someone living alone who was 65 years of age or older. The average household size was 2.90 and the average family size was 3.17.

In the township the population was spread out, with 28.5% under the age of 18, 7.8% from 18 to 24, 27.2% from 25 to 44, 24.4% from 45 to 64, and 12.1% who were 65 years of age or older. The median age was 37 years. For every 100 females, there were 123.9 males.  For every 100 females age 18 and over, there were 123.3 males.

The median income for a household in the township was $51,667, and the median income for a family was $55,972. Males had a median income of $32,500 versus $21,071 for females. The per capita income for the township was $21,144.  About 4.2% of families and 5.8% of the population were below the poverty line, including 9.9% of those under age 18 and none of those age 65 or over.

References

Townships in Sibley County, Minnesota
Townships in Minnesota